João Raimundo Colombo (born February 28, 1955 Lages, Santa Catarina) is a Brazilian politician and member of the Social Democratic Party (PSD). He served as the Governor of the southern Brazilian state of Santa Catarina from January 1, 2011, to April 5, 2018

References

1955 births
Living people
People from Lages
Brazilian people of Italian descent
Democratic Social Party politicians
Democrats (Brazil) politicians
Social Democratic Party (Brazil, 2011) politicians
Members of the Chamber of Deputies (Brazil) from Santa Catarina
Members of the Federal Senate (Brazil)
Governors of Santa Catarina (state)